African American Short Films is an American television show. It is the only nationally televised program, in first-run syndication, featuring short films starring, produced, written or directed by African American filmmakers. The show has received several Telly Awards.

African American Short Films began airing in 2002 as a one-hour quarterly television special in first-run syndication. The program was created by veteran television producer Frank Badami.

Shorts
The short film Window, starring Louis Gossett Jr. was included in the program in 2007.

The short film Stuck for a Reason, starring actress, writer, producer Hillary Hawkins was included in the program in 2015.

References

External links 
Official site

First-run syndicated television programs in the United States
English-language television shows